General Hosh Muhammad Sheedi Qambrani or Hoshu Sheedi (Sindhi: هوش محمد شيدي) was an Askari unit, and also supreme commander of Sindh's Talpur army led by Mir Sher Muhammad Khan Talpur. Hoshu Sheedi fought against the British forces under Sir Charles James Napier at the Battle of Hyderabad, and was killed on March 24, 1843.
Hosh Muhammad belonged to the African-descent Siddi community of Sindh, Pakistan. Before his death in the Battle of Hyderabad, he called out the famous slogan:

{{cquote|

Hosh Muhammad was respected by the British commanding officer, Sir Charles James Napier, who buried him with full military honours.

Early life
Hosh Muhammad was born in 1801. Before joining the army, he worked at the residence of Talpur rulers.

Mausoleum

The historical mausoleum of Hosho Sheedi Qambrani is in Dubee, a small village approximately 10 kilometers from Hyderabad. It was built to pay tribute to the war martyrs and was declared a heritage site. The building currently needs maintenance and restoration. It is a historical place of Sindh which is neglected by the government and community.

References

External links

Hosh Muhammad Sheedi Flyover, Qasimabad, Hyderabad, Sindh
Sindh Sheedi Samaji Welfare Sangat

Siddhi people
1843 deaths
1801 births